Venezuela first participated at the Olympic Games in 1948, and has sent athletes to compete in every Summer Olympic Games since then. Venezuela has also participated in the Winter Olympic Games since 1998. The Venezuelan Olympic Committee (COV) was created in 1935.

The first Venezuelan athlete to participate in the Olympic Games was cyclist Julio César León in London 1948. In 1968 Francisco Rodríguez earned the first gold medal. The first Venezuelan to participate in the Winter Olympic Games was Iginia Boccalandro, in the 1998 Winter Olympics.

Venezuelan athletes have won a total of nineteen medals, all at Summer Games, with boxing (six medals; one gold, three silver, two bronze) being the most successful sport. The most successful Olympian is Yulimar Rojas, Venezuela's only multi-medalist in a regular Games, with one gold and one silver in women's triple jump.

History 

The first Venezuelan athlete to participate in the Olympic Games was Trujillo cyclist Julio César León in London 1948.

In the 1952 Summer Olympics, Asnoldo Devonish earned a bronze medal which became the first Olympic medal in the country's sports history. In 1968 Francisco Rodríguez earned the first gold medal; obtaining silver and bronze medals in various games until 1984. The first Venezuelan to participate in the Winter Olympic Games was Iginia Boccalandro in Nagano 1998. Rafael Vidal was bronze medalist in the 200 m butterfly in swimming at the 1984 Los Angeles Olympic Games. Arlindo Gouveia won a gold medal in taekwondo in Barcelona 1992, but at that time the sport only participated as an exhibition. That medal, along with the bronze medal won by Adriana Carmona in the same sport, are counted as official by the Venezuelan Taekwondo Federation since 2018.

Athens 2004 

Venezuela participated in the 2004 Athens Games with 48 athletes, winning two bronze medals with Adriana Carmona and Israel Rubio in taekwondo and weightlifting.

Turin 2006 

Venezuela participated in the Turin 2006 Winter Olympics thanks to Werner Hoeger in the luge specialty.

Beijing 2008 

In the 2008 Beijing Games, Venezuela became the only country (only behind the host China) to double the number of athletes qualified with respect to the previous games, going from 48 athletes in Athens 2004 to 108 athletes in 2008, making it the delegation with the greatest progress with respect to the last games. For this occasion, Venezuela qualified for the first time 3 team sports, men's and women's volleyball and the women's softball team. Previously, only in 1980 in Moscow (soccer) and in Barcelona 1992 (basketball) had Venezuela been able to qualify team sports. In these games, Venezuelan Dalia Contreras won the bronze medal in Taekwondo in the 49 kilograms category, after defeating Kenyan Mildred Alango 1–0.

London 2012 

Fencer Rubén Limardo wins the third gold medal for the nation. Limardo also becomes the first Latin American to win a gold medal in fencing since 1904, over 100 years ago.

Sochi 2014 

Venezuela achieves its 4th participation in the 2004 Winter Olympic Games thanks to the athlete Antonio Pardo Andretta in the alpine skiing specialty.

Río 2016 

In these Olympic Games, Venezuela almost achieved a number of athletes almost equal to that of Beijing 2008, and even achieved a better record of medals than in those Olympic Games, with a total of three medals in the categories of boxing, cycling and athletics by the Venezuelan representatives: Yoel Finol, Yulimar Rojas and Stefany Hernández, thus completing their participation in these Olympic Games with one bronze medal and two silver medals.

Tokyo 2020 

In these Olympic Games, Venezuela competes with 44 athletes being its smallest delegation since 1988, obtaining 4 medals; 3 silver medals won by Julio Mayora and Keydomar Vallenilla in weightlifting and Daniel Dhers in BMX freestyle and a gold by Yulimar Rojas in triple jump, who broke the world and Olympic record in the history of this category of athletics in the Olympic Games, with a mark of 15. 67 meters, in addition to becoming the first woman to receive a gold medal in the history of the Olympic Games for Venezuela.

Medal tables

Medals by Summer Games

Medals by Winter Games

Medals by sport

List of medalists

Summer Olympics

Multiple medalists

Most successful Olympian progression
This table shows how the designation of most successful Venezuelan Olympian has progressed over time.

Notes
  Venezuela won two demonstration medals in taekwondo (one gold and one bronze) at the 1992 Summer Olympics. As a demonstration sport, the medals are not recognized as Olympic medals by the International Olympic Committee; the Venezuelan Taekwondo Federation says that the 1992 medals are recognized and lists them among the nation's taekwondo medals, but all other countries and athletes who received medals in the sport in 1992 do not recognize their own medals, and do not count them toward the all-time total of medals of their respective countries. For accuracy and consistency, those of Venezuela are not counted.

References

See also
 List of flag bearers for Venezuela at the Olympics
 :Category:Olympic competitors for Venezuela
 Venezuela at the Paralympics
 Tropical nations at the Winter Olympics

External links